Céline Tripet (born 3 May 1990) is a Swiss badminton player.

Achievements

BWF International Challenge/Series 
Mixed doubles

  BWF International Challenge tournament
  BWF International Series tournament
  BWF Future Series tournament

References

External links 
 

1990 births
Living people
Swiss female badminton players
21st-century Swiss women